Graham Bradley Wilson (born 17 November 1970) is a former English cricketer.  Wilson was a right-handed batsman who fielded as a wicket-keeper.  He was born in Scunthorpe, Lincolnshire.

Wilson made his debut for Lincolnshire in the 1994 Minor Counties Championship against Hertfordshire.  Wilson played Minor counties cricket for Lincolnshire from 1994 to 1996, which included 15 Minor Counties Championship matches and 2 MCCA Knockout Trophy matches.  He made his only List A appearance against Gloucestershire in the 1996 NatWest Trophy.  In this match, he was dismissed for a single run by Mark Alleyne, while behind the stumps he took 2 catches and made 2 stumpings.

References

External links
Graham Wilson at ESPNcricinfo
Graham Wilson at CricketArchive

1970 births
Living people
Cricketers from Scunthorpe
English cricketers
Lincolnshire cricketers
Wicket-keepers